Joshua Janos Gregor Steiger (born 6 April 2001) is an Austrian football player. He plays for Wolfsberger II.

Club career
He made his Austrian Football Bundesliga debut for Wolfsberger AC on 19 August 2017 in a game against FC Admira Wacker Mödling.

References

External links
 

2001 births
Living people
Austrian footballers
Austria youth international footballers
Association football midfielders
Wolfsberger AC players
SV Lafnitz players
Austrian Football Bundesliga players
2. Liga (Austria) players
Austrian Regionalliga players